VA-45, nicknamed the Fish-Hawks, was an Attack Squadron of the U.S. Navy. It was the first squadron to carry the VA-45 designation. The squadron was established as Torpedo Squadron VT-75 on 1 June 1945, redesignated VA-4B on 15 November 1946, and as VA-45 on 1 September 1948. It was disestablished on 8 June 1950.

Home port assignments
The squadron was assigned to these home ports, effective on the dates shown:
Naval Auxiliary Air Station Chincoteague – 01 Jun 1945
Naval Air Station Norfolk – 20 Mar 1946
Naval Air Station Jacksonville – 14 Feb 1949

Aircraft assignment
The squadron first received the following aircraft in the months shown:
SBF-4E – June 1945
SBW-4E – June 1945
SB2C-4E – September 1945
SB2C – 5 March 1946
AD-1 – 27 March 1947
AM-1 – February 1949
AD-1 – 20 October 1949

See also
Attack aircraft
History of the United States Navy
List of inactive United States Navy aircraft squadrons

References

Attack squadrons of the United States Navy
Wikipedia articles incorporating text from the Dictionary of American Naval Aviation Squadrons